The Opposition with Jordan Klepper is an American late-night talk and news satire program that aired on Comedy Central from September 25, 2017, to June 28, 2018. The show was hosted by comedian Jordan Klepper, a former correspondent on The Daily Show, and satirized right-wing politics. It aired each Monday through Thursday at 11:30 pm (EST), following The Daily Show.

On June 15, 2018, Comedy Central announced that it was canceling the show after one season, but that Klepper would be hosting a new primetime weekly talk show, Klepper.

Production
Jordan Klepper served as a correspondent on The Daily Show for three years. Klepper's segments on the show received positive reviews. During his time on the show, he substituted for Trevor Noah in October 2016. In April 2017, Comedy Central announced that Klepper would host a new show, debuting in the fall, that would follow The Daily Show. In July 2017, the title of the show was revealed to be The Opposition with Jordan Klepper, and had a premiere scheduled for September 25, 2017.

On June 15, 2018, Comedy Central announced the show would be ending after its June 28 episode.

Cast
Klepper served as host. The show had "citizen journalists", which is a concept similar to The Daily Show'''s correspondents: Josh Sharp, Aaron Jackson, Laura Grey, Kobi Libii, Niccole Thurman and Tim Baltz.

Writers
The show was written by Jordan Klepper, Ian Berger, Owen Parsons, Russ Armstrong, Kristen Acimovic, River Clegg, Chelsea Davison, Chelsea Devantez, Pia Glenn, Asher Perlman, Justin Tyler, Steve Waltien, Seth Weitberg, and Keisha Zollar.

Episodes

Reception
On Metacritic, season one of The Opposition with Jordan Klepper has an average weighted score of 56 out of 100, based on 4 critics, indicating "mixed or average reviews" from critics. On review aggregator website Rotten Tomatoes, the first season has an approval rating of 71% based on 7 reviews, with an average rating of 6.2/10.

Awards and nominations

See also
 Lights Out with David Spade, successor in timeslot
 The Nightly Show with Larry Wilmore, predecessor in timeslot
 The Colbert Report'', predecessor in timeslot

References

External links 
 
 

2010s American late-night television series
2010s American political comedy television series
2010s American satirical television series
2010s American television news shows
2017 American television series debuts
2018 American television series endings
American news parodies
American television spin-offs
Comedy Central late-night programming
Comedy Central original programming
English-language television shows
Political satirical television series
Television shows filmed in New York City